List of chairmen of the Assembly of Turkmenistan:

References

Lists of Turkmenistan politicians
 
Turkmenistan